Kane is a surname of English or Irish origin. In England, it is derived from the old English name (k)cana. In Ireland however, the name is of different origins as an anglicisation of Mac Catháin, and in Scotland, a sept of Clan MacMillan.

Artists
Adelaide Kane, Australian actress
Amory Kane, American composer and musician
Art Kane, fashion and music photographer (who created the 1958 portrait of 57 jazz musicians, A Great Day in Harlem)
Arthur Kane, American bassist of the New York Dolls
Barbara Sanchez-Kane, Mexican fashion designer
Ben Kane, English novelist, specialising in historical fiction.
Ben Kane (record producer), American record producer
Big Daddy Kane, American rapper
Bob Kane, most famous as the creator of Batman
Candye Kane (1965–2016), American blues and jazz performer
Carol Kane, American actress
Chelsea Kane, American actress and singer, originally known as Chelsea Staub
Chris Kane, Australian guitarist and songwriter of Eye of the Enemy
Christian Kane, American actor and country musician
Christopher Kane, Scottish fashion designer
Clinton Kane (born 1998/1999), Australian singer, songwriter, and musician
David Kane (pianist), US/Scottish composer and jazz pianist
Eden Kane (born 1940), British singer
Gil Kane, comic book artist
Greg Kane (musician) (born 1966), Scottish musician, and co-member of Hue and Cry
Cheikh Hamidou Kane, Senegalese writer.
Harry Kane (illustrator) (1912–1988), American illustrator and artist
Henry B. Kane (1902–1971), American illustrator, photographer, and author of nature books for children
Herb Kawainui Kane, artist-historian and author.
John Kane (artist), Scottish painter
Joseph Kane, U.S. film director and producer
Justin Kane, American actor
Kevin Kane (musician), Canadian songwriter
Kimberly Kane, American pornographic actress
Miles Kane, British singer
Phil Kane, Scottish keyboard player of The Silencers
Samuel Kane (born 1968), British actor
Sarah Kane, English playwright
Thommy Kane, Actor, filmmaker, Songwriter and composer
Tom Kane, American voice actor

Sportspeople
Ben Kane (footballer), Australian Australian rules footballer
Boyd Kane, hockey player for the AHL's Hershey Bears
 DeAndre Kane, American basketball player in the Israeli Premier League and EuroLeague
Evander Kane, hockey player for the NHL's Edmonton Oilers
George Francis Kane (born 1948), American chess master
Harry Kane (born 1993), English footballer
Harry Kane (baseball) (1883–1932), American baseball player
Harry Kane (hurdler) (born 1933), British hurdler
Herbie Kane (born 1998), English footballer
Jim Kane (disambiguation), multiple people
Justin Kane, Australian boxer
Patrick Kane, hockey player for the NHL's New York Rangers
Rick Kane (1954–2009), NFL running back played for the Detroit Lions and Washington Redskins 
Stanley Kane, English footballer
Todd Kane, English footballer
Tony Kane, Irish footballer

Politicians and military people
Elisha Kent Kane, medical officer in the United States Navy during the first half of the 19th century, member of two arctic expeditions
James Kane (1895–1964), Australian politician
Kathleen Kane (born 1966), Pennsylvania lawyer and former attorney general convicted of felony perjury
Michael N. Kane (1851–1924), American lawyer, judge, and politician
Richard Rutledge Kane, Resident Commissioner of the Solomon Islands Protectorate
Thomas L. Kane (1822–1883), American Civil War general and founder of Kane, Pennsylvania

Scholars
Charles L. Kane, American theoretical physicist
Daniel Kane (linguist), Australian linguist, expert on Jurchen and Khitan languages
Daniel Kane (mathematician) (born 1986),  American mathematician
Pandurang Vaman Kane (1880–1972), Sanskrit scholar and an awardee of the Bharat Ratna
Thomas R. Kane, American academic

Science and medical
Evan O'Neill Kane (1861–1932), surgeon who performed several self-operations
Gordon L. Kane, scientific leader in theoretical and phenomenological particle physics
Jasper H. Kane, (1903–2004), American biochemist
Katherine Sophia Kane (1811–1886), Irish botanist
Shanley Kane, American technology writer 
Suzanne Amador Kane, American scientist

Other
Agnes Kane Callum (1925–2015), American genealogist
Carol Kane (businesswoman), co-founder and joint CEO of Boohoo.com
Kane (noble family), a Norwegian noble family
Vincent Kane, British news reporter

Fictional
Barry Kane from Saboteur
Bette Kane, or Betty Kane, the DC Comics Pre-Crisis Bat-Girl
Billy Kane, a video game character created by SNK Playmore, appearing in the Fatal Fury and The King of Fighters series
Carter and Sadie Kane, protagonists from the series The Kane Chronicles by Rick Riordan
Charles Foster Kane from Citizen Kane
Erica Kane, fictional character from the American television soap opera All My Children
Fergus K. Kane from Lady in the Lake
Garrison Kane, comic book character from the Marvel Universe
Gilbert Kane, character in the film Alien
Reverend Henry Kane, fictional character from the Poltergeist film trilogy
John Kane, a fictional character who appeared in a number of episodes of "So Weird", portrayed by Canadian-British actor Mackenzie Gray
John Michael Kane, one of the aliases of Jason Bourne in the Bourne Identity by Robert Ludlum
Kathy/Kate Kane, Batwoman
Lucas Kane, protagonist of the video game Fahrenheit a.k.a. Indigo Prophecy
Marcus Kane from The 100 (TV series)
Marshall Kane from Community
Matthew Kane, the protagonist of the computer game Quake 4
Needles Kane, character in the video game series Twisted Metal originally developed by Singletrac
Solomon Kane, fictional 16th century Puritan adventurer created by Robert E. Howard
Will Kane from High Noon

References

English-language surnames
Jewish surnames
Kohenitic surnames